Maati Bouabid (Arabic: المعطي بوعبيد, November 11, 1927 in Casablanca – November 1, 1996 in Rabat) was a politician and a lawyer who served as the Prime Minister of Morocco between March 22, 1979 and November 30, 1983. He was the 9th prime minister of Morocco and served under king Hassan II. He also served as the Minister of Labor and Social Affairs from 1968 to 1970 and Minister of Justice.

Early life 
Maati Bouabid was born in 1927 in the city of Casablanca. After completing his primary and secondary education in his hometown, he traveled to France and obtained a law degree from the University of Bordeaux and a postgraduate degree in private law.

Career 
Bouabid was sworn to the legal profession in 1952 and was registered at the high table in 1955.

Bouabid was offered an official position at the start of independence, like young law graduates, few in number then. He accepted the post of public prosecutor at the regional court of Tangier from 1956 until the unification of the court of appeal of Tangier in 1957.

Bouabid was the first mayor of the city of Casablanca and president of the Moroccan club Raja CA from 1966 to 1968.

In 1983, Bouabid and a group of people with whom he shared common convictions founded the Constitutional Union party, with Bouabid remaining the founding leader and de facto head of this party throughout three national conferences. In the eighteenth government, which lasted from November 30, 1983 to April 11, 1985, he was Minister of State.

Death 
Bouabid died on November 1, 1996, after suffering a heart attack. He was 69.

References 

1927 births
1996 deaths
People from Casablanca
Prime Ministers of Morocco
Constitutional Union (Morocco) politicians
Raja CA
Moroccan football chairmen and investors